The Imperial Service College (ISC) was an English independent school based in Windsor, originally known as St. Mark's School when it was founded in 1845.

In 1906, St Mark’s School absorbed boys from the former United Services College, which had failed. In 1911, St Mark’s was also in difficulties, and after securing support from the Imperial Service College Trust it was renamed as Imperial Service College, St Mark’s. On the death of Lord Kitchener in 1916, Prince Alexander of Teck, soon to become Alexander Cambridge, 1st Earl of Athlone, launched a public appeal for a permanent endowment of the school in Kitchener’s memory. He noted that the Imperial Service College had been founded “for the purpose of providing a public school education for the Sons of Officers of limited means belonging to the Navy, Army, and Higher Civil Services.”

In 1942, the school merged with Haileybury to form Haileybury and Imperial Service College.

During the 1950s, part of the site was the home of the Royal Horse Guards Light Aid Detachment Royal Electrical and Mechanical Engineers  (LAD REME RHG), while the school’s Kipling Memorial Building (1939) was occupied by the Royal Borough of New Windsor Council.

The area is now being redeveloped as offices.

Notable alumni

Military
Colonel John L. Collard, MC, Order of the Star of Nepal, Nepalese Burma Medal
Lt. Colonel Charles J. Boulter, MC, O.B.E.
Air Vice-Marshal Sir Laurence Sinclair, GC
Group Captain Randolph Stuart Mills DFC
Sir John Gorman, MC
Wing Commander Clive Beadon, DFC, Burma Star
Sir Richard Williams, KBE, CB, DSO: the only Australian to command the RAAF Wing in the field in World War I and the first Australian to become an Air Marshal
Group Captain Peter Erskine Vaughan-Fowler, CVO, DSO, DFC and bar, AFC, Croix de Guere, Legion d' Honneur
Others
Frank Ayton: electrical engineer and pioneer of electric vehicles
Charles Ede: founder of the Folio Society
William Hartnell: actor who played the first Doctor Who
Krishen Khanna: Indian artist
Hubert Stanley Middleton, organist and Cambridge academic.
Prince Andrew Romanov, Russian royal and artist
Peter Woods, journalist, newsreader

Benefactors

Patrick Young Alexander

References

Defunct schools in the Royal Borough of Windsor and Maidenhead

Educational institutions disestablished in 1942
1942 disestablishments in England
Haileybury and Imperial Service College